Dear Heaven (also known as Love in Heaven) is a South Korean television series starring Yoon Jung-hee, Lee Tae-gon, Cho Yeon-woo, Lee Soo-kyung, and Wang Bit-na. It aired on SBS from September 10, 2005 to July 2, 2006 on Saturdays and Sundays at 20:45 for 85 episodes.

According to AGB Nielsen Media Research, it was the 5th highest rated TV program in Korea for the year 2006, with an average rating of 28.3%, and a peak rating of 44.5%.

The popular soap opera invited both criticism and high ratings for its provocative plot. The story revolved around a middle-aged woman who introduces her handsome news anchor stepson to her abandoned daughter, who had led a miserable life because of a cruel stepmother. It triggered controversy when the woman was revealed as the girl's biological mother. Viewers were divided on whether it was "immoral" and "incestuous" or a fresh take on relationship dramas, but director Lee Young-hee insisted that the show's theme was "deep maternal love, with a mother reclaiming her own daughter as a daughter-in-law in order to atone for having abandoned her as a baby."

Plot
When she was very young, Ji Young-sun (Han Hye-sook) gave away her baby Lee Ja-kyung after giving birth to her. She later remarries and creates a new family, but soon after, her husband dies, leaving her behind with her stepson Gu Wang-mo (Lee Tae-gon), and her daughter Gu Seul-ah (Lee Soo-kyung).

Now grown and a makeup artist, Lee Ja-kyung (Yoon Jung-hee) finds herself adrift with loneliness since her foster parents died when she was a child. She fell in love with her step-uncle but his family shuns her, dashing away any hopes of being with him. Deciding to focus on her career and find a new love, she meets Wang-mo, a TV news anchor.

Young-sun has been searching for the daughter whom she had abandoned in her youth. As if guided by the hand of fate, she discovers that Ja-kyung is already going out with Young-sun's own stepson, Wang-mo. In order to keep her secret daughter by her side, Young-sun does everything in her power to marry Ja-kyung to Wang-mo, and eventually succeeds. The two women form a curious double relationship, as at once mother/daughter and mother-in-law/daughter-in-law.

Cast
Yoon Jung-hee as Lee Ja-kyung 
Lee Tae-gon as Gu Wang-mo

Gu family
Han Hye-sook as Ji Young-sun
Lee Soo-kyung as Gu Seul-ah
Jung Hye-sun as Hwang Maria (paternal grandmother)

Kang family
Wang Bit-na as Kang Ye-ri (TV news anchor)
Kang Ji-sub as Kang Yi-ri (brother)
Hyun Suk as Kang Dong-choon (father)
Lee Bo-hee as Kim Mi-hyang (mother)
Park Hae-mi as Kim Bae-deuk (aunt, Mi-hyang's sister)

Lee family
Im Chae-moo as Lee Hong-pa (Young-sun's first love)
Ban Hyo-jung as Mo Ran-shil (Hong-pa's mother)
Kim Young-ran as Bong Eun-ji (Hong-pa's wife)

Extended cast
Cho Yeon-woo as Kim Cheong-ha (movie star)
Geum Dan-bi as Mun-ok (Ja-kyung's friend)
Lee Sook as Bae-deuk's friend
Lee Dae-ro as Bae-deuk's dancing partner

Awards
2005 SBS Drama Awards
New Star Award: Cho Yeon-woo
New Star Award: Lee Tae-gon
New Star Award: Yoon Jung-hee

2006 SBS Drama Awards
Grand Prize (Daesang): Han Hye-sook 
Top 10 Stars: Han Hye-sook

References

External links
Dear Heaven official SBS website

International broadcast
 It aired in Vietnam on VTV3 channel from October 27, 2007, called Thiên đường tình yêu.

Seoul Broadcasting System television dramas
2005 South Korean television series debuts
2006 South Korean television series endings
Korean-language television shows
South Korean romance television series
South Korean melodrama television series